The Adula Formation  is located in Yunnan Province of southern China.

Geology
This formation contains grayish black thin-bedded sandstone, mudstone, and intercalating beds of coal seams.

The Adula Formation has been dated to the Late Triassic Period.

See also

References

Triassic System of Asia
Geologic formations of China
Geology of Yunnan
Upper Triassic Series